Günter Guillaume (1 February 1927 – 10 April 1995) was an East German spy who gathered intelligence as an agent for East Germany's secret service, the Stasi, in West Germany. Guillaume became West German chancellor Willy Brandt's secretary, and his discovery as a spy in 1973 led to Brandt's downfall in the Guillaume affair.

Early life
Günter Karl Heinz Guillaume was born on 1 February 1927, at 31 Choriner Straße in Prenzlauer Berg, then a working-class district of Berlin. He was the only child of Karl Ernst Guillaume, a pianist who played in bars and theatres, where he provided background music for silent films, and Johanna Old Pauline, a hairdresser. His parents, who had married four months before Günter's birth, were both native to Berlin. Due to the combination of the Great Depression and the introduction of sound films, the Guillaumes suffered financial hardship. These experiences made the extremist policies being presented by Adolf Hitler and Nazi Party attractive to Karl Guillaume, and he joined the party in March 1934.

Guillaume was conscripted as a Flakhelfer in 1944 and later joined the Nazi Party.

Career
In 1956, he and his wife Christel, also a Stasi agent, emigrated to West Germany on Stasi orders to penetrate and spy on West Germany's political system. Rising through the hierarchy of the Social Democratic Party of Germany, he became a close aide to West German chancellor Willy Brandt.

In 1974, West German authorities discovered that Guillaume was spying for the East German government. The resulting scandal, the Guillaume Affair, led to Brandt's resigning the chancellorship. On 15 December 1975, Guillaume was sentenced to 13 years in prison for treason; his wife Christel, to eight years. In 1981, Guillaume was returned to East Germany in exchange for Western spies caught by the Eastern Bloc. Christel, who returned earlier that year, divorced him.

In East Germany, Guillaume was received and celebrated as a hero, worked as a spy trainer, and published his autobiography Die Aussage ("The Statement") in 1988. Two years later, he married his second wife, nurse Elke Bröhl. Guillaume and East German spymaster Markus Wolf said that Willy Brandt's downfall was not intended, and that the affair was among the Stasi's biggest mistakes. After Die Wende and German reunification, the reunified Germany granted Guillaume immunity from any further prosecutions. He was a supportive witness in Wolf's trial for treason in 1993.

Death
Guillaume died of heart attack and a stroke on 10 April 1995, in Petershagen/Eggersdorf, near Berlin. Guillaume's first wife died on 20 March 2004.

In culture
The Brandt-Guillaume story is told in the play Democracy by Michael Frayn. It follows Brandt's political career as West Germany's first left-of-centre chancellor in 40 years, and his fall because of his assistant. It portrays Guillaume as in conflict by spying on Brandt while growing to admire him.

Notes and references

Notes

References

External links

 

1927 births
1995 deaths
Stasi officers
People from Pankow
Nazi Party members
East German spies
Deaths from cancer in Germany
Deaths from kidney cancer
People convicted of spying for East Germany
Luftwaffenhelfer